The Practitioner is a medical journal established in 1868 by Macmillan Publishers with Francis Anstie as the editor.

References

External links 

Publications established in 1868
General medical journals